Seepersad Naipaul (1906–1953) was an Indo-Trinidadian writer. He was the father of V. S. Naipaul, Shiva Naipaul, Kamla Tewari (née Naipaul), and Sati Bissoondath (née Naipaul), and married into the influential Hindu Indo-Trinidadian Capildeo family.

Career
Seepersad Naipaul worked as the first Indo-Trinidadian journalist for the Trinidad Guardian. His only book, The Adventures of Gurudeva, is a collection of linked comic short stories that was first published in Trinidad and Tobago in 1943 (under the title Gurudeva and Other Indian Tales). The elder Naipaul wanted his son "Vido" (as he called him) to try to get his story collection published in London, in the hope that any money it earned would help the family escape from the poverty in which they lived in Trinidad and Tobago. The book was not published in London until after Seepersad's death.

Between Father and Son: Family Letters (edited by Gillon Aitken), correspondence with V. S. Naipaul, and other family members, dating from around the time Vidia won a scholarship to Oxford University until the older Naipaul's death, was published in 1999, and extracted in The New Yorker.

See also
 Capildeo family

References

1906 births
1953 deaths
Seepersad
Trinidad and Tobago Hindus
Trinidad and Tobago journalists
20th-century journalists